The Airbus THOR (Test of Hi-tech Objectives in Reality) is an unmanned aerial vehicle (UAV) by Airbus partially produced through the process of 3D printing. It is possibly the world's second 3D printed aircraft, flying four years after the world's first in 2011, Sulsa. Presented for the first time at the 2016 Berlin Air Show, except the electrical engine parts, the drone-like model is entirely made by 3D printing from polyamide. Although still in beta phase, aircraft like THOR are intended to make flights more economical and safer.

THOR made its maiden flight in November 2015 near Hamburg where it passed most of the tests.

Specifications

References

External links
 Airbus tests high-tech concepts with an innovative 3D-printed mini aircraft

Unmanned aerial vehicles of Germany
Airbus aircraft
Aircraft manufactured in Germany
3D printing